Wilderness Hotel & Golf Resort is a large water resort in Wisconsin Dells, Wisconsin. It is part of a chain of two resorts, the newer and smaller one being Wilderness at the Smokies in Tennessee. The chain also includes four small outdoor waterparks.

Timeline
Wilderness Hotel & Golf Resort is owned and operated by the Helland and Lucke families, and the grandsons of the original founder. Tom Lucke, co-owner of Wilderness Hotel & Golf Resort; Peter Helland Jr., co-owner and vice president; Tim Lucke, co-owner and project manager; and Pat Helland, co-owner and director of development. Their late grandfather, Oliver “O.P.” Helland, was the founder of the Riverview Boat Line back in 1921. He is known as one of the first local river men to arrange boat touring for the purpose of sightseeing along the Wisconsin River.

O.P. Helland, well known during his time as a civic rights activist and esteemed entrepreneur, was instrumental in evolving the area into what is now considered one of the premier tourist destinations of the Midwestern United States; he would prove to make history by forever changing the entire face of the local economy in The Dells.

A short time after Riverview Boat Line was founded, O.P. Helland began the process of developing a restaurant and series of retail shops using the income that he earned from tourists. He had purchased adjacent land along the river and among these bustling properties included Hotel Helland; a hotel located directly across the street from the local train station. Building a hotel in this specific location proved to be an excellent decision; the busy area proved to provide steady business as the hotel would accommodate a flurry of business travelers and vacationers.

In 1952, operations of the company were taken over by Peter Helland Sr, attorney Hans Helland, and Virginia Helland Lucke; three children of O.P Helland. They are the direct predecessors of the current owner-operators of the resort; Pat Helland and Peter Helland Jr. are the sons of Peter Sr., Tim and Tom Lucke are the sons of Virginia, and Hans is their uncle. Virginia served as the head of the retail department of the company, while her brother Peter Sr. took the greater task of overseeing daily management of the company.

At the age of 28, Tom Lucke acquired a motel property called The Riviera. This would prove to be his first descent into a local hotel industry that he would historically and singlehandedly redefine in regards to the unique combination of indoor and outdoor water park properties with quality lodging accommodations.

In 1995, the 443-unit Wilderness Hotel & Golf Resort opened its doors. It is Tom Lucke’s fifth and most heavily themed resort in The Dells tourist region. Tom also developed the tropical themed Polynesian Hotel, the Atlantis, the Bahama Bay, and the Caribbean Club resorts.

In 1995, the Wilderness Hotel and Golf Resort opened for business along U.S. Highway 12 (Wisconsin Dells Parkway) with a  water park named Fort Wilderness. In 1999, the hotel added its second indoor waterpark, Klondike Kavern, and an additional sixty guest rooms.

In 2002, the resort opened the Wild West region of the hotel which has 162 guest rooms. It also includes Dodge ‘Em City, a  indoor play park featuring Timberland Playhouse and Lake Wilderness outdoor waterpark. In 2003, the Wild West Waterpark opened for business.

In 2003, a 108-condominium, upscale resort, called Wilderness on the Lake, opened for business. It is home to Cubby's Cove, a  indoor/outdoor waterpark complete with an Infinity pool overlooking Lake Delton.

In the summer of 2005, to mark the resort's 10th anniversary, the Wilderness Hotel & Golf Resort opened two thrill rides, the Hurricane and Black Hole waterslides.

In April 2006, the Wilderness opened its largest indoor waterpark yet, the Wild WaterDome. This  waterpark is home to a large indoor wave pool, the Dueling Mammoths family raft ride, and a toddler play 'n spray area. The waterpark also features a FoilTec roof that is permeable to UV rays, allowing people to tan indoors. The resort also closed Fort Wilderness Waterpark, its first indoor waterpark.

In July 2006, Glacier Canyon Lodge, the Wilderness's third property, opened along with a 3.2 acre outdoor waterpark called the Lost World.

In 2008, the Wilderness unveiled Wild Rock Golf Club, a championship 18-hole course containing a difficult hole 17 called "Boneyard North", and renovated the Klondike Kavern waterpark.

In 2009, the Wilderness unveiled three indoor, 3-D, blacklight mini-golf courses, an outdoor mini-golf course, go-karts and a zip line adventure. The resort also opened Tombstone Town Haunted Hotel and Mineshaft Mirror Maze.

In 2010, the Wilderness renovated all of the Wilderness Hotel & Golf Resort guest rooms.

In 2012, the Wilderness opened the Northern Lights Sky Ropes Course, located in the Wild West region of the hotel. The resort also added the Lunar Loop and Cosmic Drop Whitewater West Drop Slides at the Lost World Water Park.

In 2015, the resort would redo the Klondike Krash Water Slides would be turned in the Claim Jumper Challenge Water Slides, two dueling Whitewater West Slideboarding slides.

The resort also features Wild Rock Golf Club, and the Wilderness Woods Par 3 Family Course. A skywalk is connected to the Glacier Canyon Lodge, and boats take guests to the Wilderness on the Lake Resort.

Resort Areas

New Frontier Area

This area is themed after Western United States forests and mountain ranges. Its buildings are painted brown with highlights of green and black.

Features

Klondike Kavern Indoor Waterpark

Opened in 1999
Klondike-themed
Claim Jumper Challenge (1999), two  Proslide PIPElines retrofitted with Slideboarding in 2015
Known as Klondike Krash from 1999 to 2015
Originally emptied into Bonanza Brook
New fiberglass runouts made by WhiteWater were added when Slideboarding debuted
Mine Shaft (1999), two high speed Proslide Twister body slides
One of the slides is only for guests 150 pounds or less
Bonanza Brook (1999), a  lazy river
Bonanza Bluff (2007), an SCS Interactive water play structure
The Hurricane (2005), a 2–4 rider, multi-sensory ProSlide Tornado 60.
Originally opened as an open air, outdoor slide before the funnel was capped in late 2005
Received theming upgrades in 2007 including a fake newscast of a hurricane coming off of the Great Lakes
This is a separately themed ride from the rest of the waterpark, similarly to its sister ride, Black Hole.
Sulfur Springs (1999), Indoor/Outdoor Spas & Pools
Kodiak Kanteen, snack bar
Former Attractions
Gold Mine Mountain (1999), an interactive water play structure
Replaced in 2007 by Bonanza Bluff due to sightline complaint issues from parents

Wild WaterDome Indoor Waterpark

Opened in 2006
Originally announced as the Wild KingDome Waterpark
Transparent roof, for tanning and plant growth
The Great Wave (2004), wave pool
Originally opened outdoors as The Great Tsunami
Wild WaterDome was built around it
Mini-Mammoths Cove, a zero-depth toddler activity area
The Dueling Mammoth (2006),  Proslide Mammoth racing family raft rides
Survivor's Bar & Grill
Wooly's Eatery, snack bar
Private cabanas
Margarita's Swim-Up Bar (Summer 2014)

New Frontier Outdoor Waterpark

Opened in 1996
Gold Rush Tube Slide (1998), a  enclosed Proslide PIPEline tube slide
Gold Rush Body Slide (1998), a mostly-open Proslide Twister body slide
Timber Falls Tube Slide (1996), a Proslide PIPEline tube slide that launches off a 30-foot tower
Prospector's Creek (1998), a  lazy river
Toddler's Cove, a zero-depth play area
Banana Slides (1996), Proslide short body slides for small children.
New Frontier Springs, a large hot spa
Bear Foot Island Sprayground (2013), an oasis area for children under 48" and their parents
Raccoon Saloon
Former Attractions
Bear Foot Island (1998), NBGS International aquatic play structure
Replaced by Bear Foot Island Sprayground
The Great Tsunami (2004), Wave Pool
Still in use, however the Wild WaterDome has been built around it

New Frontier Atrium
 Wilderwoods Arcade, arcade
 Wildwoods Go-Kart Trail, (2014) 525 foot go-kart course
 TakeFlight (2020), SimEx Iwerks Flyride 
 TommyKnockers Bar
 Wild Canyon Cafe
 Fast Molly's Gift Shop
 Survivor's Bar And Grille
 Former Attractions
 OK Corral Lazer Tag (2004 to 2020)
 Powered by Lazer Runner
 Originally located above Klondike Kavern Waterpark, current home of the Klondike Boardwalk
 Moved to the former location of Fort Wilderness and later Tombstone Town near the New Frontier Lobby in 2014
 Moved to former location of CyVRspace and Wild Buccaneer in 2020 with a new lazer tag system
 Marshall Training Lazer Maze Vault (2014 to 2020)
 Tombstone Town and Mineshaft Mirror Maze (2009 to 2013)
 Fort Wilderness Waterpark (1995 to 2005)
 Upgraded in 2002, adding another deck and repositioning slides to the back of the play structure
 Also features a basketball pool, sauna, and hot tub

Guestroom Area
 Polka Dot Pots, children's pottery studio

Wild West Area
This area is themed after the American West in the 1800s and its buildings are painted crimson with brown highlights.

Features

Wild West Indoor Waterpark

Opened in 2003 at a cost of $10 million
Western gold mine-themed
Fantastic Voyage (2003), Proslide Mammoth family raft ride
The Black Hole (2005), a single-rider, multi-sensory ProSlide CannonBowl
Originally opened as an open air, outdoor slide before the bowl was capped in late 2005
Originally names Cannonbowl, renamed and rethemed in 2008 as the Black Hole
Separately themed from the rest of the waterpark
High Plains Hot Springs, an indoor/outdoor spa
Grizzly's Grill, snack bar
The Swimm'n Chick'n, restaurant
The Twisted Trails Dueling Tube Slides With Eye Dropped Trusclent Points
The Warped Wagons Dueling Mat Slide With The Same Feature As Twisted Trails
Ransack Ridge V2 Opened October 1st 2022 To The Public
Yeehaw's Watering Hole A Swim Up Bar 
Former Attractions
Wilderness Express (2003 to 2022), Proslide PIPEline tube slide Thirsty Buffalo Restaurant (2003 to 2022)
Wild West Body Slides (2003 to 2022), four high-speed Proslide Twister slides
Two slides on the left side, nearest the Black Hole, have not been in use in some time
Last known day of operation is unknown
Ransack Ridge (2003 to 2022), a NBGS International interactive water-play structure
Opened as the largest aquatic play structure in the world
Surge (2003 to 2009), a NBGS International interactive wave pool
Wild West Bumper Boats 2009-2022 Closed For Yeehaw's Watering Hole

Lake Wilderness Outdoor Waterpark

Rafter's Rage Tube Slide (2002), a  Proslide PIPEline tube slide
Rafter's Rage Body Slide (2002), a  Proslide Twister body slide
Lil' Chutes Banana Slides (2002), two side-by-side Proslide body slides for little ones
A children's wading pool with hands on water features
Island Pool, a  lazy lake complete with sideline play activities and built-in lounging ridge
A lap pool and water basketball
Lily pad obstacle walk
Volleyball pool
Hot spas
Mackinac Tap & Snack Shack
Midway Macs Outdoor Grill
9 private poolside cabanas available for rent

Wild West Area - Dodge 'Em City
 Northern Lights Arcade (2002)
 Northern Lights Ropes Course (2012) RCI Ropes Course above the Northern Lights Arcade
 Timberland Play Park (2002), children's play structure
 Structure replaced with current attraction in 2017
 Wild Abyss Mini-Golf (2009), indoor, glow-in-the-dark, mini-golf course
 Received upgrades to current layout and course in 2020
 Lost Cabin Lazer Tag Arena (2020)
 Clip 'N Climb Challenge Walls (2019)
 Pistol Pete's Ice Cream (2004)
 Thirsty Buffalo Bar And Grill
 Candy Cabin
 OP's Marketplace, convenience store
 The Trading Post, gift shop
 Giddy-Up Pub
 Former Attractions
 CyVRspace (2017 - 2020), a virtual reality arena
 Wild Buccaneer Mini-Golf (2008 - 2017
 Sulfur Springs Hot Tub (2002 - 2009)
 Hot tub for adults to watch children playing in Timberland Play Park
 Hence the reason for the locker rooms near Timberland today

Guestroom Area
 Fitness Center

Wilderness on the Lake
Wilderness on the Lake is an upscale, 108 condominium resort. The property features a  indoor/outdoor waterpark, called Cubby's Cove, which features a pool overlooking Lake Delton. This area is only connected to the main resort by a 10-minute shuttle bus ride, year-round, and a ferry service in the summer. The area is built to appeal to young adults with small children.

Features

Cubby's Cove Waterpark

  indoor/outdoor waterpark
 Opened in 2003
 Cubby's Cove (2003), NBGS International aquatic play structure for kids
 Indoor/outdoor hot spas
 Water basketball pool and water walk
 Vanishing Edge Lagoon infinity pool (Outdoor)
 Play and spray zero-depth area for small children (Outdoor)

Glacier Canyon Lodge
The newest resort of the three Wilderness properties located on the Wilderness Territory, this facility is a condominium resort with 460 units. It has an outdoor waterpark (Lost World), which with an interactive river, three hot tubs, activity pools, and Halley's Comet Racers. This area also includes a  Conference Center, a mega-arcade, go-karts, and nature trails. Half of this area is owned by Wilderness Territories, the other half is owned by Wyndham Resorts.

Features

Lost World Outdoor Waterpark
Largest outdoor waterpark, spanning 3.2 acres
Opened in 2006
Dinosaur-themed
Lost World Adventure River (2006), an interactive lazy river
Halley's Comet Racers (2007), a four lane Proslide OctopusRACER mat racing slide
Fossil Falls (2006), a SCS Interactive play-'n-spray structure with a 750-gallon tipping bucket
Crocodile Cove (2006), an island pool designed for lounging
Dino Mania (2006), an area with water basketball, lily pad water walk activity, and two sport slides
15 private, poolside cabanas available for rent
Lunar Loop (2012), 5 story WhiteWater AquaLoop slide with launch capsules
The Cosmic Drop (2012), 5-story WhiteWater AquaDrop body slide with launch capsules
Three outdoor hot spas
The Big Dig Restaurant
Dinosaur Crossing Restaurant
T-Rex Retreat
Jurassic Joe's

Outdoor Area
 Go-Karts and Kiddie-Karts (2009)
 Jurassic outdoor mini-golf (2009)
 Wyndham outdoor pool
 Jurassic Journey Nature Trail
 Lost Canyon Zipline (2009)
 Picnic area
 Lost Canyon Carriage Tours, private, not advertised by Wilderness, only accessible outside the resort. The land is leased to Lost Canyon Riding Stable by Wilderness Territory.

GCL Conference Center
 Conference Center
 Bean Bodega Coffee Shop
 Convenience store

Wyndham Lobby
 Canyon Ridge Tap Room And Restaurant
 Campside Coffee Shop

Outlets
 Field's Premier Steakhouse, part of the Wilderness resort, on Wilderness property.
 Sarento's Italian Restaurant, part of the Wilderness Resort, short shuttle bus down the road.
 Monk's At The Wilderness restaurant, private, advertised by Wilderness as part of the resort, on Wilderness property.

Wilderness Transportation System
The Wilderness operates a shuttle bus system with three lines:

 Blue Line - between the main campus and Wilderness On The Lake
 Red Line - between the main campus, Sundara Inn And Spa, Wild Rock Golf Course, Wilderness Condos, and Wilderness Vacation Villas.
 Green Line - between the main campus, Glacier Canyon Lodge, and Wyndham Glacier Canyon. Stops at many more locations on the main campus than the other two lines.

In addition, Wilderness Territory operates a ferry service called Wilderness Water Shuttle between the Wild Rock Golf Course, Wilderness On The Lake, and two other Lake Delton harbors during the summer.

References

https://www.wildernessresort.com/wp-content/uploads/2013/01/Developers-History.pdf

Water parks in Wisconsin
Wisconsin Dells, Wisconsin
1995 establishments in Wisconsin